"The Thirty Fathom Grave" is episode 104 of the American television anthology series The Twilight Zone. It originally aired on January 10, 1963 on CBS. In this naval-themed episode, the crew of a Navy destroyer hear a mysterious rhythmic noise coming from a sunken submarine.

Opening narration

Plot
In April 1963, a U.S. Navy destroyer is on a routine patrol off Guadalcanal when sonar picks up a sound beneath the waves; the crew believe that it sounds like something banging on metal.

They discover a submarine on the ocean floor, but inquiries to naval command reveal no recent sinkings in the area. A joking suggestion from some of the crew that the sub may be haunted sends an anxious and bewildered Chief Boatswain's Mate Bell, who has been feeling unwell for a couple of days, into a frenzy of bizarre behavior, including fainting spells. The destroyer's commander, Captain Beecham, orders the ship's diver, McClure, to investigate. They find out that it is an American submarine, and the metal sound is coming from inside. When McClure bangs on the submarine hull, the metal banging seemingly responds. Chief Bell begins to see apparitions of dead sailors beckoning him. The ship's doctor unsuccessfully tries to convince Bell that he is just having nightmares, and reports to the captain that Bell is experiencing effects of psychological trauma which could be caused by his wartime experiences. The doctor finds a pile of seaweed in the spot where Bell saw the apparitions.

McClure later discovers the number of the submarine, "714", which Beecham identifies as belonging to a submarine that was sunk during the First Battle of the Solomon Sea in early August 1942, almost twenty years ago. Although stunned at the idea that someone inside the submarine could still be alive, Beecham asks Pacific Fleet command for an emergency-priority rescue operation. McClure goes down again to try to ascertain exactly where the sound is coming from, to help the rescue outfit determine where to enter the ship. The diver receives no response to his bangs on the hull, but he finds a dog tag which he delivers to Beecham. It belongs to Chief Bell.

When Beecham shows the dog tag to Bell, he recounts that he was a signalman on a submarine during the war. He dropped a signal light while attempting to change the infrared filter at night, causing the filter to fall off. As a result, Japanese destroyers saw the light and attacked. Bell was blown into the water by the shelling. The captain ordered a dive, but depth charges sank the boat. Bell, the sole survivor, was later rescued by an American destroyer. Bell tells Beecham that he now understands: his dead shipmates know he is above them right now and are demanding that he join them. Bell is overcome by survivor guilt, and says, "I sunk that sub. I'm responsible." Despite Captain Beecham's efforts to convince Bell that his mistake did nothing, that a boat caught on the surface and surrounded by enemy ships was already doomed, Bell dons the dog tag, races out on deck and jumps overboard, shouting, "They're calling muster on me!" The destroyer's crew are unable to save Bell or find his body.

Later, McClure accompanies the rescue mission into the submarine. Upon returning to the ship, he reports to Beecham that the boat was a wreck inside, and no one was left alive. Inside the control room, he found the periscope shears cut in half, with one section  swinging back and forth. When Beecham asks him to confirm that this was the clanging noise they had heard, McClure agrees, but adds that he also saw the remains of eight dead sailors; one was holding a hammer in his hand.

Closing narration

Cast
Mike Kellin as Chief Bell
Simon Oakland as Captain Beecham
David Sheiner as Doc 
John Considine as McClure 
Bill Bixby as OOD Smith
Conlan Carter as Ensign 
Forrest Compton as ASW Officer 
Henry Scott as Jr. OOD
Anthony D. Call as Lee Helmsman
Charles Kuenstle as Sonar Operator
Derrik Lewis as Helmsman
Vincent Baggetta as Crewman
Louie Elias as Crewman

Production notes

References
DeVoe, Bill. (2008). Trivia from The Twilight Zone. Albany, GA: Bear Manor Media. 
Grams, Martin. (2008). The Twilight Zone: Unlocking the Door to a Television Classic. Churchville, MD: OTR Publishing.

External links

1963 American television episodes
The Twilight Zone (1959 TV series season 4) episodes
Submarines in fiction
Fiction set in 1963
Television episodes written by Rod Serling
Ghosts in popular culture